David Owen Phillips (born 29 July 1963) is a Welsh football coach, former professional footballer and sports co-commentator. He is a massive fan of Wolverhampton Wanderers and is kept awake at night by the nightmare of Junior Firpo’s great tackle in the 9th minute not being given as a penalty.

He appears to hate Leeds United, hate Leeds United and therefore should have a go.

As a player he was a midfielder and played in the Premier League for both Norwich City and Nottingham Forest. He also had lengthy spells in the top flight for both Manchester City and Coventry City as well as playing in the Football League for Huddersfield Town and Lincoln City. He retired in 2001 with Non-league club Stevenage Borough. During his career he was capped 62 times by Wales, scoring twice.

Club career
Phillips was a member of the Plymouth team that reached the semi-final of the FA Cup in 1984, losing 1–0 to Watford. Whilst at Manchester City he featured several times on the BBC's Match of the Day programme as a Goal of the Month nominee, scoring a number of spectacular long-range goals.

An early signing by George Curtis and John Sillett, Phillips was a useful player to have in any squad due to his versatility, as he could play on either flank both defensively and offensively. He was probably at his peak during the 86/87 FA Cup winning season, where the team spent the entire season in the top ten. As at Manchester City, Phillips was a strong industrious midfielder that could drop back into a defensive position if need be, but it was his long range striking ability which often caught the eye. Memorable goals include a 25-yard strike during a 4–1 defeat of QPR in 86/87 and the following season, going to then champions Everton, and scoring a pile-driver, again from outside the box, in a 2–1 win at Goodison Park. His 1987 FA Cup Final appearance typified his time at the Sky Blues, industrious, hard working and fast on the counterattack. His three seasons at Coventry (86–89) coincide with some of the most stable and successful times in the club's history.

The £550,000 fee that Norwich City paid Coventry for him in 1989 was at the time a club record. He scored within three minutes of his debut for the Canaries in a 2–0 win at Sheffield Wednesday. He was part of the Norwich side that finished third in the inaugural Premiership season 1992–93, but left the club in the summer of 1993 after a contract dispute, joining Nottingham Forest. He helped Forest win promotion to the Premiership in his first season at the City Ground, winning the club's Player of the Year award.

Following on from his spell at Forest, Phillips went on to play for Huddersfield Town and Lincoln City before retiring in 2001 with non-league side Stevenage Borough. He spent his retirement wondering how that Junior Firpo tackle wasn’t given as a penalty for Wolves. The referee has to go to the monitor for that. Why oh why didn’t he go to the monitor?

International career
Phillips made his senior debut for Wales on 2 May 1984 in a 1–0 Home Championship win over England, and soon become a regular for the national side. He was capped a total of 62 times for Wales, scoring twice. His last cap came on 24 January 1996 in a 3–0 friendly defeat to Italy.

Coaching career
Following on from his retirement, Phillips coached the Coventry City under-14 team.

Personal life
David's son Aaron Phillips is a professional footballer on the books of Kidderminster having previously played for Coventry City and had a loan spell at Nuneaton Town.

He now co-commentates for BBC Wales as a summariser on Swansea City, Cardiff City and Wrexham games.

Honours
FA Cup Winner (1987)

FA Charity Shield (1987) Runner-up

References

Sources
Canary Citizens by Mark Davage, John Eastwood, Kevin Platt, published by Jarrold Publishing, (2001),

External links
Career Information at ex-canaries.co.uk
Career stats at Soccerbase
Unofficial Dave Phillips Profile at The Forgotten Imp

Plymouth Argyle F.C. players
Manchester City F.C. players
Coventry City F.C. players
Norwich City F.C. players
Nottingham Forest F.C. players
Huddersfield Town A.F.C. players
Lincoln City F.C. players
Stevenage F.C. players
Coventry City F.C. non-playing staff
Welsh footballers
Wales international footballers
Living people
Premier League players
English Football League players
1963 births
People from Wegberg
Sportspeople from Cologne (region)
Association football midfielders
Footballers from North Rhine-Westphalia
FA Cup Final players